Otávio Ataide da Silva (born 21 April 2002) is a Brazilian footballer who plays as a defender for Campeonato Brasileiro Série B club Sampaio Corrêa on loan from Flamengo.

Career

Flamengo

Sampaio Corrêa loan
On 13 February 2002 Otávio moved to Sampaio Corrêa on loan until the end of the 2022 season.

Career statistics

Club

Honours

Club
Flamengo
Campeonato Brasileiro Série A: 2020
Campeonato Carioca: 2021

References

2002 births
Living people
Brazilian footballers
Association football defenders
Sport Club Internacional players
CR Flamengo footballers
Sampaio Corrêa Futebol Clube players
Campeonato Brasileiro Série A players
Campeonato Brasileiro Série B players